August 6 - Eastern Orthodox liturgical calendar - August 8

All fixed commemorations below are observed on August 20 by Eastern Orthodox Churches on the Old Calendar.

For August 7, Orthodox Churches on the Old Calendar commemorate the Saints listed on July 25.

Feasts

 Afterfeast of the Transfiguration of Our Lord, God, and Savior Jesus Christ.

Saints

 Venerable Candida the Byzantine.
 Hieromartyr Narcissus, Bishop of Jerusalem (c. 213)
 Martyrs Marinus the Soldier (see also: March 17) and Asterius the Senator, at Caesarea in Palestine (260)
 Martyr Dometius of Persia and his two disciples (363)
 Venerable Or (Horus) of the Thebaid (390)
 Virginmartyr Potamia of Alexandria, the Wonderworker, by the sword (4th century)
 Venerable Hyperechius of the "Paradise", Egypt  (4th century)
 Saint Vardan the Martyr, of Armenia (451)
 Venerable Theodosius the New, of the Peloponnese, the healer (862)
 The Venerable 10,000 Ascetics of the Thebaid, reposed in peace.
 Saint Sozon of Nicomedia.

Pre-Schism Western saints

 Saint Faustus, a soldier martyred in Milan in Italy under Commodus (c. 190)
 Hieromartyr Sixtus II (Xystus), Pope of Rome, martyred with his deacons (258)  (see also: August 10 - in the East)
 Saints Peter, Julian (Juliana) and Companions,  a group of twenty or more martyrs in Rome under Valerian and Gallienus (c. 260)
 Saint Carpophorus, Exanthus, Cassius, Severinus, Secundus and Licinius, soldiers martyred in Como in the north of Italy under Maximian Herculius (c. 295)
 Saint Donatian, second Bishop of Châlons-sur-Marne in France (4th century)
 Saints Donatus, second Bishop of Arezzo in Italy, and Hilarinus, a martyr in Ostia (4th century)
 Saint Victricius of Rouen, former army officer, became missionary in the north of France, and Bishop of Rouen, Confessor (407)
 Saint Donatus, Bishop of Besançon (c. 660)
 Saint Donat (Dunwyd), patron saint of St Donat's or Llandunwyd in Glamorgan in Wales.

Post-Schism Orthodox saints

 Venerable Pimen the Much-ailing (Poemen), of the Kiev Caves (1110)
 Venerable Pimen the Faster, of the Far Caves in Kiev (ca. 1141)
 Saint Mikallos of Akanthou in Cyprus, one of the "300 Allemagne Saints" in Cyprus (12th century)
 Saint Mercurius of the Near Caves in Kiev, Bishop of Smolensk (1239)
 Venerable Nicanor the Wonderworker of Mt. Callistratus (1419 or 1549)
 Venerable David of Euboea, Wonderworker (c. 1589)  (Church of Greece; see also November 1)
 Venerable Dometius of Philotheou Monastery on Mount Athos, the "standard-bearer", and wonderworker (16th century)
 Saint Theodora of Sihla (18th century)
 Venerable Anthony of Optina, Schema-Abbot, Elder of Optina Monastery (1865)
 Venerable Joseph 'Gerontogiannis', monk of Kapsa Monastery on Crete (1874)

New martyrs and confessors

 New Hieromartyr Alexander Khotovitsky, Protopresbyter, of New York and Moscow (1937)
 New Hieromartyrs Peter Tokarev, Michael Plyshevsky, John Vorontsov, Demetrius Milovidov, and Alexei Vorobyov, Priests (1937)
 New Hieromartyr Athanasius (Yegorov), Abbot, of Izmailovo (Moscow) (1937)
 New Hieromartyr Elisha Schtolder, Deacon (1937)
 New Hieromartyr Basil Amenitsky, Priest (1938)

Other commemorations

 Commemoration of the First Siege of Constantinople (Saving of Constantinople from the Persians and Avars) (626)
 Uncovering of the relics (1832) of St. Metrophanes of Voronezh (Macarius in schema), Bishop of Voronezh, the first bishop there (1703)
 Synaxis of the Saints of Valaam Monastery.
 Valaam Icon of the Mother of God.
 Repose of Elder Adrian of South Dorotheus Monastery (1853)
 Repose of Schemamonk John the Silent (John the Blind), of Valaam Monastery (1894)
 Repose of Elder Callinicus the Hesychast, of Katounakia, Mt. Athos (1930)
 Repose of Archimandrite Vladimir of Jordanville Monastery, New York (1988)

Icon gallery

Notes

References

Sources
 August 7 / August 20. Orthodox Calendar (PRAVOSLAVIE.RU).
 August 20 / August 7. HOLY TRINITY RUSSIAN ORTHODOX CHURCH (A parish of the Patriarchate of Moscow).
 August 7. OCA - The Lives of the Saints.
 The Autonomous Orthodox Metropolia of Western Europe and the Americas (ROCOR). St. Hilarion Calendar of Saints for the year of our Lord 2004. St. Hilarion Press (Austin, TX). p. 58.
 Menologion: The Seventh Day Day of the Month of August. Orthodoxy in China.
 August 7. Latin Saints of the Orthodox Patriarchate of Rome.
 The Roman Martyrology. Transl. by the Archbishop of Baltimore. Last Edition, According to the Copy Printed at Rome in 1914. Revised Edition, with the Imprimatur of His Eminence Cardinal Gibbons. Baltimore: John Murphy Company, 1916. pp. 235-236.
 Rev. Richard Stanton. A Menology of England and Wales, or, Brief Memorials of the Ancient British and English Saints Arranged According to the Calendar, Together with the Martyrs of the 16th and 17th Centuries. London: Burns & Oates, 1892. pp. 383-386.

 Greek Sources
 Great Synaxaristes:  7 ΑΥΓΟΥΣΤΟΥ. ΜΕΓΑΣ ΣΥΝΑΞΑΡΙΣΤΗΣ.
  Συναξαριστής. 7 Αυγούστου. ECCLESIA.GR. (H ΕΚΚΛΗΣΙΑ ΤΗΣ ΕΛΛΑΔΟΣ).

 Russian Sources
  20 августа (7 августа). Православная Энциклопедия под редакцией Патриарха Московского и всея Руси Кирилла (электронная версия). (Orthodox Encyclopedia - Pravenc.ru).

August in the Eastern Orthodox calendar